"Just Once in My Life" is a song written by Gerry Goffin, Carole King and Phil Spector. The song was released by the Righteous Brothers in 1965 and reached No. 9 on the Billboard Hot 100.

The Righteous Brothers' original
After the success of the Righteous Brothers' first single with Phil Spector, "You've Lost That Lovin' Feelin'", the writers of the song Barry Mann and Cynthia Weil then wrote "(You're My) Soul and Inspiration" for them. The song however was not completed, and Spector instead asked Carole King to write a song for the duo, which turned out to be "Just Once in My Life".

The Righteous Brothers released their version as a single in April 1965 as the follow-up to "You've Lost That Lovin' Feelin'". Their second release on the Philles label, the single was another big hit, making the top ten of the Billboard Hot 100, reaching number nine.

Billboard described the song as "exciting, dramatic, emotion filled production performances by the "Lovin' Feeling" boys" which "can't miss."

Charts

The Beach Boys version 
The song was covered by the American rock band the Beach Boys and released on their 1976 album 15 Big Ones.

Personnel 
Personnel per 2000 liner notes.

The Beach Boys
Carl Wilson – lead vocal, percussion
Brian Wilson – lead and backing vocals, piano, organ, Moog synthesizer, ARP String Ensemble
Al Jardine – backing vocals
Mike Love – backing vocals
Dennis Wilson – drums

Additional musicians
Ed Carter – guitar
Ricky Fataar – percussion
Billy Hinsche – guitar
Bruce Johnston – backing vocals

Other recordings
Other artists to release versions include:
The Alan Price Set
The Action.

Sources 

1965 singles
The Righteous Brothers songs
Song recordings produced by Phil Spector
Songs with lyrics by Gerry Goffin
Songs written by Carole King
Songs written by Phil Spector
The Beach Boys songs
1965 songs
Philles Records singles